Urban Ladder is an omnichannel furniture and decor retailer based out of Bangalore, India. Urban Ladder currently has 3 stores in Bangalore and distribution across 75+ cities in India through its website.

History 
Urban Ladder Home Decor Solutions was co-founded by Ashish Goel (CEO) and Rajiv Srivatsa in July 2012. Ashish Goel previously worked with McKinsey & Company and served as the CEO of Amar Chitra Katha. Rajiv Srivatsa previously worked with Cognizant and Yahoo! before co-founding Urban Ladder.

Urban Ladder is a design-led, omnichannel brand which offers furniture and home decor. With over 5000 designs across 35 categories such as living, dining, bedroom, study, and decor, Urban Ladder was established as an online-first brand in 2012. In 2017, Urban Ladder made a shift to offline retail, in an effort to become an omnichannel brand. It opened its first flagship store in Bangalore on 8 July 2017 and currently has 4 offline stores in Bangalore.

Rajiv Srivatsa, one of the founders of Urban Ladder, quit the company in October, 2019 after seven years with the company.

In November 2020, Reliance Retail acquired the company by purchasing 96% stake in a  crore deal.

Funding 
Urban Ladder secured seed capital of $US1 million from Kalaari Capital in August 2012. The company later raised another $US5 million in a Series A round led by SAIF Partners; Kalaari Capital too participated in the Series A funding. The company subsequently raised $US21 million in Series B round of funding led by Steadview Capital, SAIF Partners and Kalaari Capital  Four months after the company raised Series B funding from Steadview Capital and existing investors SAIF Partners and Kalaari Capital, Urban Ladder received a personal investment from Ratan Tata, Tata Sons.

On 9 April 2015, Urban Ladder announced that they had raised $US50 million in funding led by Sequoia Capital and TR Capital. Existing investors Steadview Capital, SAIF Partners and Kalaari Capital were also participants.

Urban Ladder, raised an internal round of $12 million from investors Kalaari Capital, Saif Partners, Sequoia Capital, and Steadview Capital in February 2018. In combination with the $15 million raised in January 2017, these funds were used to further Urban Ladder’s omnichannel expansion, online and offline – a decisive step towards profitability in FY 18–19. With a $27 million infusion over 12 months, Urban Ladder's omnichannel approach and profitability push will help it build a powerful retail brand.

Business model 
Urban Ladder has both online and offline business model for distribution. The company delivers and installs all the products it offers. The brand has also put its products on marketplaces Amazon and Flipkart.

Urban Ladder is continually creating and launching new collections like the Malabar, the Eleanor & Louise, and the Fujiwara range,

Urban Interiors
Urban Ladder launched design consultation as a service in 2016.

The Urban Ladder Design Network
Apart from its in-house collections and consultations, Urban Ladder works with external designers. The Urban Ladder Design Network provides external designers with 3D rendered models of its products. The partnered designers also get priority inventory blocking on Urban Ladder’s products and a commission when their clients select Urban Ladder’s designs for their homes. Currently, Urban Ladder has over 600 design firms working with them as part of The Urban Ladder Design Network, with the tribe increasing every month.

Awards and recognition 
Urban Ladder collected the 'Best Digital Start-Up' Award  at the 4th India Digital Awards conducted by Internet and Mobile Association of India. Ashish Goel was voted by the Network 7 Media Group Jury as "Game Changer Entrepreneur of the year" 2016 at Satya Brahma founded 8th edition of India Leadership Conclave 2016.

References 

Reliance Retail
Online retailers of India
Indian companies established in 2012
Retail companies established in 2012
Internet properties established in 2012
Companies based in Bangalore
Furniture companies of India
Furniture retailers of India
2012 establishments in Karnataka